Christian Amoah (born 25 July 1999) is a Ghanaian weightlifter who currently competes in the 85 kg event. He competed in the Men's 77 kg at the 2014 Commonwealth Games.

Amoah represented Ghana in the Men's 85 kg at the 2016 Summer Olympics in Rio de Janeiro, Brazil. He was the inaugural male Ghanaian to compete in weightlifting at the modern Olympics. He was also the youngest athlete to take part in weightlifting at the 2016 Summer Olympics.

He represented Ghana at the 2020 Summer Olympics.

Competition record

References

External links 
 

1999 births
Living people
Ghanaian male weightlifters
Olympic weightlifters of Ghana
Commonwealth Games competitors for Ghana
Weightlifters at the 2016 Summer Olympics
Competitors at the 2019 African Games
African Games bronze medalists for Ghana
African Games medalists in weightlifting
Weightlifters at the 2014 Commonwealth Games
Weightlifters at the 2020 Summer Olympics
Sportspeople from Accra
20th-century Ghanaian people
21st-century Ghanaian people